KDFJ-LP (105.9 FM) is an FCC licensed low power FM radio station serving Fairbanks, Alaska and parts of North Pole, Alaska. The station is owned and managed by Bible Baptist Church of Fairbanks. It airs a Religious radio format.

References

http://www.fccinfo.com/CMDProEngine.php?sCurrentService=FM&tabSearchType=Appl&sAppIDNumber=1588806

External links
 

2014 establishments in Alaska
DFJ-LP
Radio stations established in 2014
DFJ-LP
DFJ-LP